Gârbovăț may refer to several villages in Romania:

 Gârbovăț, a village in Bănia Commune, Caraș-Severin County
 Gârbovăț, a village in Ghidigeni Commune, Galați County
 Gârbovățu de Jos, a village in Corcova Commune, Mehedinți County
 Gârbovățu de Sus, a village in Căzănești Commune, Mehedinți County

and to:
 Gârbovăț, an alternate Romanian name for Gorbivtsi village, Terebleche Commune, Chernivtsi Oblast, Ukraine

See also 
 Gârbova, a commune in Alba county, Romania